Acta Linguistica Academica is a quarterly peer-reviewed academic journal published by Akadémiai Kiadó (Budapest, Hungary). It covers research on all aspects of linguistics, including socio- and psycholinguistics, neurolinguistics, discourse analysis, the philosophy of language, language typology, and formal semantics. It was formerly published as Acta Linguistica Hungarica and Acta Linguistica Academiae Scientiarum Hungaricae, obtaining its current name in 2017. The editor-in-chief is András Cser (Pázmány Péter Catholic University). The journal was established in 1951.

Abstracting and indexing
The journal is abstracted and indexed in:
Arts and Humanities Citation Index
Bibliographie Linguistique/Linguistic Bibliography
International Bibliographies IBZ and IBR
Linguistics Abstracts
Linguistics and Language Behaviour Abstracts
MLA International Bibliography
Scopus
Social Sciences Citation Index
According to the Journal Citation Reports, the journal has a 2021 impact factor of 0.690 , ranking it 145 out of 194 journals in the category "Linguistics".

References

External links

English-language journals
Quarterly journals
Linguistics journals
Akadémiai Kiadó academic journals